Aziz Jafar oglu Seyidov  (Azerbaijani: Əziz Cəfər oğlu Seyidov) (born October 6, 1956), is the current chief Prosecutor  of Baku.

Early life
Aziz Seyidov was born in Ganja, Azerbaijan on 6 October 1956. He finished school in his hometown. After serving in the army, he enrolled and successfully graduated from Baku State University Law School in 1983 and began work at Nizami raion of Baku city's Prosecutor's Office where he served as an investigator, chief investigator and then as a chief Investigator of the special cases division of the Prosecutor's Office.

Career
After working in Nizami Prosecutor's Office and then in the special cases division of the  Azerbaijan's Prosecutor General's office, Aziz Seyidov transferred to a Military Prosecution Service and served 8 years as a Military Prosecutor. In 2001 he returned to the Civilian Prosecution Service to a position of a Head of the Department of the Investigation and operational activities of Azerbaijan's Prosecutor General's office.  Aziz Seyidov has been the chief prosecutor of Baku, the capital city of Azerbaijan since 2007. He was reappointed to another five-year term in this position in 2012.

Personal life
He is married. Has four children.

Awards
For Heroism Medal-  1998

Azerbaijani Flag Order- 2008

References

Azerbaijani prosecutors
1956 births
Living people
Baku State University alumni
Lawyers from Baku
20th-century Azerbaijani lawyers
21st-century Azerbaijani lawyers